Perevalny (masculine), Perevalnaya (feminine), or Perevalnoye (neuter) is the name of several rural localities in Russia.

Modern localities
Perevalny, Stavropol Krai, a khutor in Perevalnensky Selsoviet of Mineralovodsky District in Stavropol Krai
Perevalnoye, Republic of Crimea, a selo in Simferopolsky District of the Republic of Crimea
Perevalnoye, Voronezh Oblast, a selo in Perevalenskoye Rural Settlement of Podgorensky District in Voronezh Oblast

Alternative names
Perevalny or Perevalnoye, alternative names of Perevalka, a settlement under the administrative jurisdiction of Psebaysky Settlement Okrug in Mostovsky District of Krasnodar Krai;

Notes